William Johnstone (4 November 1864 – 11 December 1950) was a Scottish footballer who played as a forward for Third Lanark and Scotland. A versatile player, he is recorded as having featured on the left wing, in the centre and at inside forward for club and country.

References

External links

1864 births
1950 deaths
Scottish footballers
Scotland international footballers
Third Lanark A.C. players
Footballers from Glasgow
Association football forwards
Place of death missing